Derek Chisora (born 29 December 1983) is a British professional boxer. He has challenged twice for the WBC heavyweight title in 2012 and 2022. At regional level, he has held multiple heavyweight championships, including the British and Commonwealth titles from 2010 to 2011, and the European title from 2013 to 2014. As an amateur, he won the ABA super-heavyweight title in 2006.

As of October 2022, Chisora is ranked as the world's ninth-best active heavyweight by BoxRec. At the conclusion of a year, he has been ranked as BoxRec's top 10 heavyweight ten times, and has been ranked as among the world's top 10 heavyweights since 2013, reaching his highest ranking at No. 5 in 2013 and 2020. Chisora's knockout-to-win percentage stands at 70%.

Early life
Derek Chisora was born on 29 December 1983 in Mbare, a suburb of the Zimbabwean capital Harare, the son of Viola and Paul Chisora. Following his parents' divorce when he was 4, Chisora spent his early years in Hatfield, in the care of his maternal grandmother and step-grandfather. As a teenager he attended Churchill School, where he became a paramedic for the school's sports team. Chisora and his family moved to the United Kingdom in 1999 when he was 16 and lived in Finchley, London.

Amateur career
A late starter in the sport, Chisora began boxing aged 19. His club, Finchley ABC in Barnet, North London, was also home to heavyweight champion Anthony Joshua. Chisora had around 20 amateur fights, which included winning the 2006 ABA super heavyweight title, after defeating Tom Dallas in the final, and a gold medal at the Four Nations Championships.

Professional career

Early career
Chisora turned professional under Frank Warren's Queensberry Promotions banner and was trained by Don Charles, alongside Dean Powell in his corner. Chisora made his professional debut on 17 February 2007 at the Wembley Arena in London, beating Hungarian István Kecskés by a technical knockout (TKO) in the second round. Chisora's second fight was against English heavyweight Tony Booth at the Millennium Stadium in Cardiff on 7 April 2007, on the undercard of Joe Calzaghe's successful WBO super-middleweight title defence against Peter Manfredo Jr., winning a points decision (PTS), by 40–36. Chisora's third fight was at the York Hall in London against Welshman Darren Morgan (5–1, 3 KOs) on 13 October 2007, winning on points after four rounds. Chisora stated in 2022 that Morgan was the hardest puncher he has ever faced in his career.

In January 2008, Chisora scored a four-round PTS victory over Paul Butlin at the York Hall, achieving his third points victory in a row, to take his record to 4–0. In June that year, in his first fight over six rounds, Chisora came up against the toughest test of his career in fellow undefeated British heavyweight prospect, Sam Sexton (7–0, 2 KOs). The bout was stopped in the final 30 seconds of the last round, when the referee decided Sexton was taking too much punishment and declared Chisora the winner by TKO. In Chisora's sixth fight, on 12 September 2008 at the Grosvenor House, in his first fight over eight rounds, he defeated American Shawn McLean via sixth-round stoppage. In Chisora's seventh fight, on 26 September 2008, against Lee Swaby, Chisora took his undefeated record to 7–0 with a third-round stoppage victory. In his eighth professional appearance, on 6 December 2008, Chisora defeated Neil Simpson at the ExCeL via a second-round corner retirement, leaving him with an 8–0 record at the end of his second year as a professional.

In Chisora's ninth bout, on 30 January 2009, he defeated Russian Daniil Peretyatko by PTS over eight rounds. In Chisora's tenth fight, on 22 May 2009, he defeated Paul Butlin for the second time, to extend his record to ten wins. Chisora was suspended for four months for biting Butlin's ear during the fifth round of their contest while in a clinch. The incident was missed by referee Dave Parris but TV replays proved conclusive, and as a result Chisora missed out on his fight for the British heavyweight title against Danny Williams. He was also fined £2,500.
On 9 October 2009, in his eleventh bout, Chisora defeated Georgian Zurab Noniashvili, knocking Noniashvili down and winning by TKO in three rounds at York Hall.

He was supposed to face Matt Skelton for the vacant Southern Area heavyweight title at the Wembley Arena in London, but the bout was cancelled. On 20 January 2010, it was announced that Chisora would get a second chance to face Danny Williams on 13 February 2010 after Sam Sexton was forced to withdraw through injury from his match with Williams. Chisora welcomed the chance, saying, "It was my own fault the fight with Williams didn't go ahead, and I've been kicking myself ever since."  Williams pulled out of the bout. Chisora instead fought Carl Baker in a British title eliminator, with the winner to face Williams. Baker entered with a unanimous decision win four months prior over Williams in the Prizefighter Series. Chisora grabbed and kissed Baker at the weigh-in for the fight. Chisora stopped Baker in the second round.

Chisora vs. Williams, Sexton II
On 2 May 2010, it was once again announced that Chisora would get yet another chance to face Danny Williams on 15 May 2010, at the Boleyn Ground in London, after Sam Sexton was forced to withdraw a second time from his rescheduled match with Williams, following his mother falling seriously ill. Chisora defeated former world title challenger Williams, winning the British title by stoppage. Chisora set the pace in the opening round and put Williams under pressure, Williams was warned twice for holding in the first round. In the second round, Chisora hurt Williams with a right uppercut before sending him to the canvas with a left hook. Williams beat the count but was met with a flurry of punches, resulting in Williams falling backwards towards the ropes, forcing referee Howard Foster to end the fight. After the fight, Williams announced his retirement, although he made a comeback in March 2011.

On 18 September 2010, at the LG Arena, in Birmingham, Chisora, defending his title for the first time, defeated Sam Sexton, who was defending his title for the second time, in a rematch. Adding the Commonwealth title to his British title via ninth-round stoppage on the undercard of Kell Brook vs. Michael Jennings on Sky Box Office. Chisora and Sexton both started fast in the opening round, exchanging punches early, with Chisora landing a series of body shots inside, and Sexton working behind the jab. In the second, Chisora began setting the pace, leading with the jab, Sexton responded, sending Chisora back against the ropes with a flurry of punches. With Chisora landing combinations to the body as the round progressed. In the third, Chisora and Sexton continued trading punches, Chisora fighting aggressively, and Sexton countering on the back foot. In the fourth, Sexton went on the offensive, and was able to land a left hook, which momentarily slowed Chisora's output. With Chisora landing punches on the front foot, taking control for the remainder of the round. In the fifth round, Chisora and Sexton began to tire, as both men kept applying pressure up close. In the sixth, Chisora landed a number of clean punches on Sexton as his work rate decreased. In the seventh, Sexton began working behind the jab once again, boxing at range. In the eighth, Chisora began trying to close the distance, with Sexton on the defensive. The bell sounding to start the ninth marked the first time Chisora and Sexton had been past eight rounds. Chisora threw a barrage of unanswered left and right hands flush on the chin, backing Sexton against the ropes, prompting referee John Keane to stop the fight.

2011–2012
Chisora was scheduled to face unified IBF, WBO, IBO, and Ring magazine heavyweight champion, Wladimir Klitschko on 11 December 2010, at the SAP Arena, in Mannheim, but Klitschko pulled out of the fight three days prior, after suffering a torn abdominal muscle. The fight was postponed, and later rescheduled for 30 April 2011, with Klitschko once again pulling out of the fight due to not being fully recovered from his injury, and the bout was cancelled so Klitschko could fight a unification match against WBA heavyweight champion David Haye on 2 July.

Chisora vs. Fury, Helenius
On 11 February 2011, the BBBofC installed English heavyweight champion, and undefeated prospect Tyson Fury as mandatory challenger for Chisora's British title. On 13 April 2011, Fury's promotional company, Hennessy Sports, won the purse bid to stage the contest. On 23 May 2011, it was announced that Chisora would defend his British and Commonwealth heavyweight titles against Fury on July 23 2011, at the Wembley Arena in London, both men went into the fight with a record of 14–0. It was also announced the fight would be televised live in the United States on pay-per-view. American outlet Integrated Sports picked up the fight charging $24.95 for a live airing at 3 p.m. EDT. At the weigh-in, Chisora weighed a career-heavy 261 pounds, while Fury came in a 255.5 pounds. On the night, Fury won by unanimous decision, with scores of 117–112, 117–112, and 118–111, handing Chisora the first professional loss of his career, and gaining his two titles. Promoter Mick Hennessy revealed the fight peaked at around 3 million viewers on Channel 5.

He was supposed to face Larry Olubamiwo (10–2, 9 KOs) on 5 November 2011, at the Wembley Arena in London, but the bout was cancelled, following Olubamiwo withdrawing due to illness. Chisora defeated Lithuanian Remigijus Ziausys on 11 November in a six-round points decision at the North Bridge Leisure Centre in Halifax. Referee John Latham scored the fight 60–54 in favour of Chisora.

Chisora faced undefeated contender Robert Helenius (16–0, 11 KOs) on 3 December 2011, at the Hartwall Arena in Helsinki for the WBA and WBO Intercontinental, and vacant European heavyweight titles. At the time of the fight, Helenius was ranked number 1 by the WBO, 3 by the WBA, 4 by the IBF, and 8 by the WBC. Chisora lost the bout in a controversial split decision, after two judges scored the fight 115–113 twice, in favour of Helenius, and the third scored 115–113 in favour of Chisora. The decision was highly criticised as most pundits and observers scored the fight in favor of Chisora. The Ring considered the outcome of the match "a gift", dropping Helenius' ranking from fifth to sixth challenger in their ratings. Chisora complained afterwards, demanding an immediate rematch on a neutral territory.

Chisora vs. Klitschko

Sources in Germany reported that Chisora was likely to fight WBC heavyweight champion Vitali Klitschko on 18 February 2012, at the Olympiahalle in Munich. On 12 December 2011, it was confirmed that Chisora would challenge Klitschko for the WBC heavyweight title. At the weigh-in, Chisora slapped Klitschko across the face when the two went head-to-head during the staredown. Chisora was quoted as saying after the slap "I ain't come here to play games I come here to fight". Moments before the fight, Chisora spat water in the face of Wladimir Klitschko whilst in the ring before the pre-fight introductions.

Klitschko boxed a disciplined fight with changing angles and superior footwork, and was able to keep the aggressive and offensive Chisora at range for the majority of the rounds. Despite bobbing and weaving, and constant pressure applied by Chisora, Klitschko was able to use his height and reach advantage to land clean straight right hands and power shots from a distance to outland Chisora, and control the pace as the bout progressed. At times, Chisora was able to deliver some punishment of his own, with most of his work coming with body shots and hooks to Klitschko's head, forcing Klitschko onto the back foot, and his best rounds being the eighth and twelfth round. All three judges unanimously scored the fight in favour of Klitschko, with scores of 118–110, 118–110 and 119–111. Despite being a decisive victory for Klitschko, Chisora earned credit for his chin and heart, and also for giving Klitschko his most competitive fight since his defeat to Lennox Lewis in 2003. Chisora also became only the fourth man (after Tino Hoffmann, Kevin Johnson and Shannon Briggs), to take Klitschko the twelve round distance.

During the Klitschko vs Chisora post-fight press conference, David Haye was present amongst the media in attendance. Haye began a verbal confrontation with both Klitschko, and his manager Bernd Bonte, challenging the WBC champion to a fight. Boente claimed Haye had turned down an opportunity to fight Klitschko, and that he would not get a second opportunity.  Chisora then intervened, calling Haye an "embarrassment", and challenged Haye to a fight, to which Haye responded that Chisora had lost "three fights in a row". Haye continued his verbal assault. Chisora taunted Haye, asking him "how's your toe?", and then left the stage to confront Haye face to face and, in front of the assembled media, the two British fighters and several bystanders became involved in a mass brawl. Haye threw punches at Chisora whilst holding a bottle in one hand, leading to Chisora accusing Haye of glassing him. Chisora's trainer Don Charles was also involved in the brawl and Haye's long-time trainer Adam Booth received a cut to the forehead whilst trying to break things up;
Booth would later accuse one of Chisora's entourage of striking him with a bottle during the confrontation, though the cause turned out to be a camera tripod that had been picked up and brandished by Haye at the end of the melee, whilst in the aftermath, Chisora was caught on video threatening to "shoot Haye".

German authorities sought both Haye and Chisora following their involvement in the brawl. On 19 February 2012, Chisora and Charles were arrested by German police at Munich Airport. Police detained Chisora, but released him without charge following questioning, whilst urging Haye to turn himself in. On 21 February 2012, Haye and Chisora both released formal statements about the incident. While Chisora "wholeheartedly" apologised for his involvement, Haye was less contrite, refusing to issue a direct apology for his involvement, claiming he had acted in self-defence.

Subsequent to a hearing in March the following year regarding the incident, Chisora had his British boxing license withdrawn, and the WBC initiated a motion to ban Chisora indefinitely and fine him for his involvement.

Chisora vs. Haye

On 8 May 2012, it was announced Haye would come out of retirement to fight Chisora, and the bout would take place on 14 July 2012, at the Boleyn Ground Stadium. It was also announced that BoxNation would promote the event in association with Team Sauerland and Hayemaker Promotions, and Alexander Povetkin would defend his WBA (Regular) heavyweight title against Hasim Rahman on the undercard. Additional security were present at the press conference and a steel fence was put in place to keep Haye and Chisora separated during the announcement.

On 9 May 2012, tickets went on sale, with 17,000 being sold on the first day of sale. On 18 May 2012, it was announced that the fight had been sanctioned by both the WBA and WBO, and Chisora and Haye would be licensed by the Luxembourg Boxing Federation.

In front of a crowd of 30,000 in attendance. Chisora entered the stadium, hooded and masked to the theme from Gladiator, and Haye to his entry music "Ain't No Stoppin' Us Now" by McFadden & Whitehead. In the opening two rounds, Chisora applied constant pressure, with Haye landing scoring shots at range. The bout heated up at the end of the third round, as Chisora closed the distance and caught Haye with a flush left hook after the bell had gone, which appeared to hurt Haye. Chisora emerged at the start of the fourth round aggressively, exchanging punches with Haye. Towards the end of the fifth round, Haye landed with a quick, hard left hook, followed by a right hand, which knocked down Chisora for the first time in his career. At the eighth count, Chisora made it to his feet, Haye connected with a series of punches, knocking Chisora down for a second time, and though he regained his feet again, the referee waved the fight off, therefore giving Haye the win by TKO in the fifth round.

2013–2014
In March 2013, Chisora was issued a new British Boxing Board of Control licence. Chisora said, "I'm glad that this whole episode is finally behind me and I can carry on with my boxing career in my own country and with a British Boxing Board of Control licence."

Chisora made his ring return on 20 April 2013 at the Wembley Arena in London. He fought Argentinian Hector Alfredo Avila. Chisora told ESPN that he would dedicate his victory to late former Prime Minister Margaret Thatcher, who was an MP for Chisora's hometown of Finchley. Avila had one point deducted in the 6th round for holding and another in the 9th for use of the elbow, but was eventually stopped in the ninth round. When asked whom he would like to fight next, Chisora mentioned British rival David Price.

Chisora vs. Scott 
It was confirmed that Chisora would return two months later on 20 July at the Wembley Arena, against undefeated American boxer Malik Scott (35–0–1, 12 KOs), for the vacant WBO International heavyweight title. Chisora won the bout via controversial knockout in round 6, following an over hand right. Scott was warned by the referee throughout the contest for repeated fouling and clinching, but was not penalized. Scott boxed well with his jab, while Chisora scored well with body punches. With 15 seconds left in the sixth round, Scott went down along the ropes from a right hand to the back of the ear, and took a knee, smiling. Scott got up at the count of nine, but then referee Edwards shouted "Out", ending the contest. Scott did not protest the seemingly premature stoppage but his corner did. Going into round six, Scott was ahead 48–47 on all three judges' scorecards. Scott's promoter, Dan Goossen stated he would lodge a protest. The BBBofC said they would not review the fight.

Chisora vs. Gerber, Pala
Chisora next fought on 21 September for the vacant European heavyweight title against 25-year-old German boxer Edmund Gerber (23–1) at the Copper Box Arena. The fight was announced 20 days prior to the fight taking place. Chisora controlled the fight from the opening bell, eventually drawing blood from Gerber after three rounds. The fight came to end in round five when Chisora threw combinations which went unanswered. The referee stepped in waiving the fight off. Chisora entered the ring in tears following the recent death of his mentor, Dean Powell. At the time of stoppage, Chisora was ahead 40–36 on all three judges' scorecards.

On 11 October, the BBBofC ordered purse bids for a fight between Chisora and David Price for The latter's British heavyweight title, with the fight to potentially take place by February 2014. The purse bid was due on 13 November. Chisora's promoter Frank Warren won the purse bid, but a fight was not made.

On 30 November, Chisora defended his WBO International title against late replacement Ondřej Pála (32–3, 22 KOs). The fight was also for the vacant WBA International title. Chisora was originally scheduled to fight Arnold Gjergjaj, who broke his ribs in sparring. He was then replaced with Italian Matteo Mudugno, who pulled out injured. Pála being the third choice. Pála landIng was able to land heavy left hooks in the first two rounds. In round three, Chisora trapped Pála in a corner and clubbed him to the head and body with a series of powerful shots which forced Pála to turn his back from the oncoming onslaught, forcing the referee to stop the contest. Chisora fought four times in 2013, winning all inside the distance.

Chisora vs. Johnson, Fury II
On 27 January 2014, it was announced that Chisora would fight former world title challenger Kevin Johnson (29–4–1, 14 KOs) at the Copper Box in London on 15 February 2014. Chisora inflicted the first knockdown of Johnsons career in the fifth round, and won by unanimous decision after twelve rounds. The official judges' scorecards read 118–109, 118–109, and 118–110 in favour of Chisora. This set up a second fight against Tyson Fury in London, although after the fight, Chisora also called out former WBA (Regular) titleholder Alexander Povetkin.

Chisora and Fury were due to meet on 26 July 2014 in a rematch. On 21 July, Chisora was forced to pull out after sustaining a fractured hand in training. Belarusian Alexander Ustinov was lined up as Chisora's replacement in the bout scheduled to take place at the Manchester Arena, Fury pulled out of the fight after his uncle and former trainer Hughie Fury was taken seriously ill. Fury and Chisora rescheduled the rematch for 29 November 2014 at ExCeL London. The bout was shown live on BoxNation. The bout was dubbed 'The Fight for the Right' as it was a final eliminator for the WBO heavyweight title and a shot at champion Wladimir Klitschko. Chisora struggled with Fury's height, reach and movement, with Fury winning the rounds comfortably until trainer Don Charles had seen enough and pulled Chisora out at the end of the tenth round. Fury used his jab to trouble Chisora and kept on the outside creating a distance with his longer reach. Chisora failed to land any telling punches, and due to Fury's awkward fighting style, end up hitting him below the belt. Chisora was warned by referee Marcus McDonnell in the first round.

2015–2016

Chisora vs. Pulev
After a period of eight months without a fight since his defeat to Fury, Chisora won five fights in five months against low ranked opponents, helping set up a fight for the recently vacated European heavyweight title against highly ranked Bulgarian Kubrat Pulev in Hamburg on 7 May 2016. The bout was also an eliminator for the IBF heavyweight title. Despite what had seemed a fairly comfortable points win for Pulev the fight ended in a split decision, with two judges scoring it 118–110 and 116–112 in Pulev's favour while the third scored it 115–113 for Chisora. The defeat left Chisora's chances of a world title shot against IBF champion Anthony Joshua in doubt.

Chisora made a comeback in Sweden on 10 September 2016 against Bosnian Drazan Janjanin and scored a second-round knockout victory following a body shot. Although Janjanin beat the count, the referee waved the fight off.

Chisora vs. Whyte
Terms were finally agreed for a fight between Chisora and British heavyweight champion Dillian Whyte to fight in a WBC title eliminator for Whyte's British heavyweight title. The fight took place in Manchester on the undercard of the Anthony Joshua vs. Éric Molina heavyweight title fight. Chisora and Whyte were feuding over the year through social media. The hype continued through to the press conference on 7 December when, following Whyte's comment that he'd attack Chisora anytime he would see him after the fight, Chisora picked up the table he was sitting at and threw it towards Whyte, just missing everyone in the way which included the promoters and trainers. As a result, the BBBofC withdrew its sanction of the fight so that the British title was not at stake. Instead, Whyte's WBC International title was at stake. Chisora lost the fight by split decision with two judges scoring the fight 115–113 and 115–114 for Whyte and one scoring 115–114 in favour of Chisora. Whyte was hurt a number of times in the fight by Chisora in the eighth, tenth and twelfth rounds. On two occasions in the twelfth, Whyte was knocked off balance by Chisora after being hit with huge shots to the head. Post fight, Whyte stated he would not give Chisora a rematch, only to change his mind later to say the potential was there. In March 2017, in an interview, Chisora claimed he offered Whyte £1.1 million for a rematch, which Whyte declined.

2017–2018 
On 24 March 2017, it was announced that Chisora would get his much awaited rematch against Finnish boxer Robert Helenius (24–1, 15 KOs) at the Hartwall Arena in Helsinki, Finland. The same arena they fought at when Helenius won a controversial split decision in December 2011. The bout would be contested for the vacant WBC Silver heavyweight title on 27 May 2017. In December 2015, the EBU ordered for Chisora and Helenius to meet, where the winner would fight Anthony Joshua. A purse bid deadline was set for 21 January 2016, but no progress was made. The fight was postponed on 16 May to take place after Summer 2017. There was no specific reason given by promoter Nisse Sauerland as to why the fight had been postponed.

Chisora vs. Kabayel
On pursuing a rematch with Dillian Whyte, on 31 August 2017, Chisora announced that he had split with promoter Team Sauerland, but re-signed with manager Steve Goodwin. On 20 September Eddie Hearn announced that Chisora had signed with Matchroom Sport, making his debut on the Paul Butler-Stuart Hall undercard on 30 September at the Echo Arena in Liverpool live on Sky Sports. Hearn believed if Chisora could win two fights by the end of the year, possibly winning the European title in the process, he would have a good case to fight Whyte again. Hearn said, "You know what you are going to get with 'Del Boy', plenty of drama and a load of heart. He will return to action in Liverpool and challenge for the European title in November. We will work towards a Whyte rematch for early next year. It's a fight that I think boxing needs to see again." Chisora fought Croatian Robert Filipovic (4–2, 3 KOs) at the Echo Arena in Liverpool, on 30 September. Filipovic was a late replacement for Jay McFarlane (3–3, 2 KOs). The fight was scheduled for 6 and ended in round 5 when the referee had seen enough, giving Chisora the win via TKO. Filipovic had one point deducted in the 4th round and another in the 5th for holding, which was done to prolong the fight. Chisora explained that he had the power to put his opponent away, but wanted to enjoy the fight.

On 25 September, Hearn revealed Chisora would challenge European heavyweight champion Agit Kabayel (16–0, 12 KOs) at the Casino de Monte Carlo Salle Medcin in Monte Carlo, Monaco on 4 November 2017. In a lethargic performance where he was outboxed by Kabayel, Chisora suffered a 12-round majority decision defeat. One judge scored the fight a 114–114 draw, whilst the remaining two judges' scored the fight 115–113 and 115–114 for Kabayel, giving Chisora his 8th professional loss. Chisora started the fight slow, remaining patient. He became more active after round 6, but failed to bustle the attack on Kabayel, who moved well with his feet. Kabayel also used quick combinations and jabs to win many of the rounds. Speaking to Sky Sports after the bout, Chisora said, "I'm not going to complain, I lost the fight. I always bounce back so I'm not worried." Eddie Hearn stated a rematch with Chisora and Whyte would still be possible.

On 3 February 2018, whilst backstage at the O2 Arena in London for Lawrence Okolie vs. Isaac Chamberlain, Hearn told YouTube channel iFL TV, Chisora would be returning to the ring on 24 March on the undercard of Dillian Whyte vs. Lucas Browne, which would also take place at the O2 Arena. Also backstage, Chisora met with David Haye and Joe Joyce, where Chisora revealed Haye had contacted his manager Steve Goodwin and offered £60,000 for him to fight Joyce. Chisora later stated if the money was right, he would fight Joyce on the Tony Bellew vs. David Haye II card on 5 May 2018. After Joyce knocked out Rudolf Jozic on 16 February, Haye revealed a new six-figure offer would be presented to Chisora, which would see him earn around the same purse he received in his loss to Kabayel. On 1 March, Joyce claimed Chisora had rejected the fight completely. Matchroom confirmed French boxer Zakaria Azzouzi (14–2–2, 10 KOs) as Chisora's opponent. After a slow first round where Chisora used his jab and stalked Azzouzi, Chisora dropped Azzouzi with a big right hand in the next round. The fight was then stopped by referee Robert Williams after Azzouzi struggled to get to his feet. The official time of the stoppage was at 2:12 of round 2. After the fight, whilst being interviewed by the Sky Sports team, Chisora called over David Haye and his fighter Joe Joyce. Prior to calling them over, Chisora referred to Joyce as a Chihuahua. Chisora first asked Haye if he had confidence in Joyce and then stated, "In front of the British public on live television, I’ll make a deal with you right now: if he (Joyce) beats me you write me a cheque of £1, if I beat him you give me your purse against Tony (Bellew) and your TV rights". Haye rejected the offer. Chisora then told Haye to not mention his name again. Haye told Sky Sports, "We offered him the same money he got for (Kubrat) Pulev, more money than he got for the European title, but you said no. Okay, we understand".

Chisora vs. Takam 
After a month of speculation, on 15 June 2018, a fight between Chisora and former world title challenger Carlos Takam was finally announced to take place at the O2 Arena in London on 28 July 2018, with the bout taking place on the undercard of Dillian Whyte vs. Joseph Parker on Sky Box Office. Takam started the fight out-working Chisora, who spent most of the rounds against the ropes looking for counters. Chisora began to take more punishment as the fight progressed and fell clearly behind on the scorecards. At one point in round 6, referee Howard Foster was looking at possibly stopping the fight with Chisora taking shots against the ropes. By round 7, Takam was landing the better shots and looked to be on his way to an eventual stoppage win; however in round 8, Chisora connected with a big right hand to Takam's head, sending him to the canvas. Takam made it unsteadily to his feet and the fight resumed only for Chisora to immediately land an identical punch and drop Takam a second time. Foster then stopped the fight with 1 minute remaining in the round. With the win, Chisora claimed the vacant WBA International title. Promoter Hearn and pundits in the arena stated he had made his way back into the heavyweight title mix. After the bout, on who he would like to fight next, he said, "I definitely want the winner of the main event (Whyte vs. Parker)." Hearn stated in the post-fight press conference that he would issue a challenge to WBC champion Deontay Wilder to defend his title against Chisora in either Brooklyn or London.

Chisora vs. Whyte II 

In mid October 2018, Whyte and Cuban boxer Luis Ortiz appeared to have a war of words and called each other out, with Ortiz stating he would come to the UK and fight Whyte on 22 December, a potential PPV date allocated to the possible Whyte vs. Chisora rematch. After hearing this, Chisora came out saying 'No one wants to see that [Whyte-Ortiz]', that he was 'the Money Man' and Whyte should fight him if he wants to earn more money. Hearn also stated despite Ortiz putting his name forward, Chisora was the front-runner to fight Whyte.

On 17 October, it was reported that Chisora had hired former rival David Haye as his new manager. The news came as a shock as both Chisora and Haye had been rivals since before they had their grudge match in 2012 and in early 2018 were involved in broken down talks when Haye tried to persuade Chisora to fight his boxer Joe Joyce. Both Haye and Chisora sat down in the Sky studios and talked about their relationship, explaining how they came to a deal. They also stated that Chisora will no longer go by the name 'Del Boy' and would now be 'WAR'. On 22 October, Whyte told Sky Sports that Chisora needed to sign a deal quick or he would look at other options. On 1 November, the rematch was announced to take place on 22 December at The O2 Arena on Sky Sports Box Office. Chisora weighed 246.2 pounds, his lightest since he fought Kubrat Pulev and Whyte weighed 246.5 pounds. Chisora lost the fight via KO in the eleventh round. At the time of stoppage, two judges had Chisora ahead 95–94 and one judge had Whyte ahead 95–94.

2019–2020

Chisora vs. Gashi, Szpilka 
On 20 April 2019, as the co-main event to Dave Allen vs. Lucas Browne, Chisora in his first bout under new trainer Dave Coldwell, won a comfortable unanimous points decision on the judges' scorecards, which read 99–91, 100–90, and 100–91 against 29-year-old German boxer Senad Gashi, after 10 far from entertaining rounds against an opponent who frustrated Chisora with his elusive style at The O2 Arena. Gashi, who suffered the third defeat of his 20-fight professional career which included 17 early knockouts in 17 victories, switched southpaw from the opening bell, landed an effective counter punch in the second but Chisora connected with a good body shot in the third and took control of the fight. Chisora continued to be the aggressor throughout but his opponent survived to the end of the contest.

On 13 June 2019, a fight between Chisora and former world title challenger Artur Szpilka was announced to take place at the O2 Arena in London on 20 July 2019, with the bout taking place on the undercard of Dillian Whyte vs. Oscar Rivas live on Sky Sports Box Office. Chisora produced a ruthless display and defeated Szpilka via 2nd Round KO. In his interview outside the ring he stated that he wanted to fight Joseph Parker next.

On 31 August 2019, a fight between Chisora and former WBO heavyweight champion Joseph Parker was announced to take place at the O2 Arena in London on 26 October 2019, with the bout taking place as the co-main event to the World Boxing Super Series: Light welterweight final between Regis Prograis and Josh Taylor live on Sky Sports Box Office. On 2 October, Parker pulled out of the fight due to illness.

Chisora vs. Price 
On 8 October 2019, David Price was announced as Chisora's replacement opponent at the O2 Arena. Chisora pressured Price from the start of the contest and floored his opponent in the fourth round as the fight was called to a halt following the Price corner throwing in the towel.

Chisora vs. Usyk 

On 11 March 2020, it was announced that Chisora would fight undefeated former undisputed cruiserweight world champion Oleksandr Usyk on 23 May 2020 at The O2 Arena in London, live on Sky Sports Box Office. The fight was postponed due to the COVID-19 pandemic. Chisora faced Usyk on 31 October 2020, and lost by unanimous decision. Usyk used his superior footwork and stamina to wear down Chisora, who became worn and exhausted later on in the fight, struggling to keep up with Usyk.

2021–2022

Chisora vs. Parker 

Derek Chisora vs. Joseph Parker had originally been scheduled to take place on 26 October 2019, but Parker was forced to pull out after suffering a spider bite injury. After the pair's respective fights against unbeaten opponents, Oleskandr Usyk and Junior Fa, it was announced on 19 March 2021 that Chisora would fight the former WBO heavyweight champion on 1 May 2021 for the vacant WBO Inter-Continental heavyweight title, live on Sky Sports Box Office. The day before the fight, the event looked to be in jeopardy as Chisora threatened to pull out, after losing a coin toss that meant he would have to walk to the ring first, which he objected to. The dispute was resolved on the day of the fight, and the fight went ahead as planned. On the night, Chisora started the fight strong, knocking Parker down in just seven seconds of the first round with a big right hand. He closed the distance and pressured his opponent in the early rounds, but Parker rallied back in the mid-to-late rounds, boxing well off the back foot and using his jab effectively to win a split decision, with scorecards of 115–113, 116–111 in his favour, and 115–113 in favour of Chisora.

Chisora vs. Parker II 
On 16 September 2021, it was announced that Chisora and Parker would square off in a rematch on 18 December, again at the AO Arena in Manchester. On the night, Parker dominated the fight, knocking down Chisora 3 times on the way to a unanimous decision. The scores were 115–110, 115–111, 114–112, all in favour of Parker.

Chisora vs. Pulev II 
Chisora defeated Pulev via split decision in a rematch on 9 July at The O2 Arena to capture the vacant WBA International heavyweight title. He won by split decision with one judge scoring it 116–112 in favour of Pulev and the other two scoring it 116–112 and 116–114 in favour of Chisora.

Chisora vs. Fury III 

On 20 October 2022, it was announced that Chisora would fight Fury in a trilogy bout for the WBC heavyweight title on 3 December at Tottenham Hotspur Stadium in London, live on BT Sport Box Office.

Chisora weighed in at 260.6lbs to Fury at 268.8lbs.

Chisora put up a good fight, but was outclassed by Fury, from the very start, and was asked by the ref if he wanted to stop the fight, at the end of the 9th round, which he refused to do. The fight however was stopped ten seconds from the end of the 10th round, with no complaints from Chisora.

Personal life
In November 2010, Chisora was found guilty of assaulting his then-girlfriend after finding text messages from another man on her phone. He narrowly escaped being sent to prison, and was given a 12-week sentence suspended for two years. He was ordered to pay £1,500 in compensation and £500 costs and complete 150 hours community work. The court was told that the fighter also had previous convictions for public order offences, assaulting a police officer and possession of an offensive weapon.

In November 2015, Chisora was stopped in his Bentley near Hyde Park in London. In September 2016, it was reported that Chisora was driving without a valid driving licence, insurance and MOT certificate. After initially being given six points, which would mean a six-month driving ban, Chisora since appealed the ban blaming his insurance broker. A date of 10 October 2016 was set for the hearing. At a court hearing in January 2017, Chisora avoided a driving ban by claiming he thought he was insured after a payment had left his account, paying for two drivers.

Chisora endorsed the Brexit Party at the 2019 European Parliament elections. In July 2022, Chisora showed his support to outgoing Prime Minister Boris Johnson by wearing a mask of Johnson's face during his weigh-in for his rematch against Kubrat Pulev, saying, "I was a big fan of Boris Johnson. I’m a big Brexit fan, I love that Brexit".

Chisora is a fan of Manchester United F.C. 

He is a Christian.

Professional boxing record

Television viewership

International

Pay-per-view bouts

Filmography

See also

 List of European Boxing Union heavyweight champions
 List of Commonwealth Boxing Council champions
 List of British heavyweight boxing champions
 List of ABA super-heavyweight champions

References

External links

1983 births
Living people
Alumni of Churchill School (Harare)
People from Finchley
Zimbabwean male boxers
Heavyweight boxers
England Boxing champions
Zimbabwean emigrants to the United Kingdom
British people convicted of assault
Sportspeople from Harare
British male boxers
European Boxing Union champions
Commonwealth Boxing Council champions
Boxers from Greater London
British Boxing Board of Control champions